The Occupational Outlook Handbook (OOH) is a publication of the United States Department of Labor's Bureau of Labor Statistics that includes information about the nature of work, working conditions, training and education, earnings and job outlook for hundreds of different occupations in the United States.  It is released biennially with a companion publication, the Career Guide to Industries and is available free of charge from the Bureau of Labor Statistics' website. The 2012–13 edition was released in November 2012 and the 2014–15 edition in March 2014.

Because it is a work by the United States federal government, the Handbook is not under copyright and is reproduced in various forms by other publishers, often with additional information or features.
 
The first edition was published in 1948.

See also

Career development
Global Career Development Facilitator (GCDF)
Holland Codes
Lists of occupations
Myers–Briggs Type Indicator
Standard Occupational Classification System

References

External links
 
 
 BLS News release
 JIST Publishing - America's Career Publisher
 ocouha: Occupational Outlook Handbook plus
 Occupational Outlook Handbook, digitized and available on FRASER

Occupations
Economic data
United States Department of Labor publications